ACRM may refer to
American Congress of Rehabilitation Medicine (ACRM)
Anti-Corruption Revolutionary Movement, a political movement in Sierra Leone led by John Amadu Bangura
Aviation Chief Radioman, a rank of the U.S. Navy